La Roque-Gageac is a commune in the Dordogne department in Nouvelle-Aquitaine, southwestern France.

Perched above the river Dordogne, the village is a member of the Les Plus Beaux Villages de France ("The most beautiful villages of France") association.

Population

See also
Communes of the Dordogne department

References

Communes of Dordogne
Plus Beaux Villages de France